Jeduthun - lauder; praising - the name of one or two men in the Bible.

 A Levite of the family of Merari, and one of the three masters of music appointed by David. (1 Chr. 16:41, 42; 25:1-6) His office was generally to preside over the music of the temple service. Jeduthun's name stands at the head of Psalms 39, 62 and 77, indicating probably that they were to be sung by his choir.
 A Levite whose son or descendant Obed-Edom was a gatekeeper at the time David brought the Ark of the Covenant to Jerusalem (1 Chronicles 16:1).
 Heman and Jeduthun were responsible for the sounding of the trumpets and cymbals and for the playing of the other instruments for sacred song. (1 Chronicles 16:42).

11th-century BCE Hebrew people
10th-century BCE Hebrew people
Books of Chronicles people
Set index articles on Hebrew Bible people